Milford Square is a census-designated place in Milford Township, Bucks County, Pennsylvania, United States.  It is located along PA Route 663 near the borough of Trumbauersville.  As of the 2010 census, the population was 897 residents. While the village has a PO Box post office, with the ZIP code of 18935, the surrounding area uses the Quakertown ZIP code of 18951. It is located on the Unami Creek (also called Swamp Creek) which drains into the Perkiomen Creek. It was formerly known as Heistville, after the Heist family, who operated Achey's Mill and lived in, and greatly renovated, the miller's home.

Campbell's Bridge was listed on the National Register of Historic Places in 1988. It is also home to Achey's Bridge, the first concrete-reinforced bridge in America. Following the design of Henry Mercer. The bridge now sits on private property.

Demographics

See also
 Achey's Mill

References

Census-designated places in Bucks County, Pennsylvania
Census-designated places in Pennsylvania